Marilyn Osborn is an American television producer and writer. She has written and produced for the series Space: Above and Beyond, The X-Files, Touched by an Angel and L.A. Doctors. She also served as a Consulting Producer on the series Promised Land.

Since meeting with fellow writer Jeff Eckerle on Law & Order: Special Victims Unit, they have worked as a team on the 
subsequent projects Unnatural History, Tower Prep and Those Who Kill starring Chloe Sevigny and James D'Arcy for A&E Network.

References

External links

American television producers
American women television producers
American television writers
Living people
American women television writers
Place of birth missing (living people)
Year of birth missing (living people)
21st-century American women